Carlea may refer to:
Carlea, Saskatchewan, a former railway station and hamlet in Canada
 Carlea, a taxonomic synonym of the plant genus Symplocos